News Live, formerly known as News TV Live, is a Philippine television news broadcasting show broadcast by GMA News TV and GTV. It premiered on February 28, 2011, as News TV Live on GMA News TV and concluded on February 21, 2021. The program was renamed News Live on February 27, 2021, following the channel's rebranding to GTV.

Overview
It features different news of the day, foreign exchange rates, and the stock market. The news update always ends with weather and live traffic updates from different key roads in Metro Manila via GMA Traffic System.

References

2011 Philippine television series debuts
Filipino-language television shows
GMA News TV original programming
GMA Integrated News and Public Affairs shows
GTV (Philippine TV network) original programming
Philippine television news shows